John Thomas (born September 5, 1960 in Brampton, Ontario) is a Canadian ice dancer. With partner Joanne French, he is the 1981 & 1982 Canadian Figure Skating Championships bronze medalist. With partner  Kelly Johnson, he is the 1983 & 1984 Canadian silver medalist. Johnson and Thomas placed 12th at the 1984 Winter Olympics.

, Thomas works as a skating coach at the Philadelphia Skating Club and Humane Society.

Competitive highlights
(with Johnson)

(with French)

 N = Novice level; J = Junior level

References

External links
 
 
 Sports-reference profile

1960 births
Living people
Canadian male ice dancers
Figure skaters at the 1984 Winter Olympics
Olympic figure skaters of Canada
20th-century Canadian people